Nasir Ali Mamun (born 1953) is a Bangladeshi portrait photographer. He is known as Camerar Kobi (The Poet with the Camera). He received The Daily Star-Standard Chartered Bank's Celebrating Life Lifetime Achievement Award in photography in 2017.

In 2016, Mamun released a photo album titled Ananta Jibon Jodi featuring photographs of writer Humayun Ahmed.

Bibliography 

 Ahmed Sofar Samay (Era of Ahmed Sofa)
 Charalnama (Story of the Untouchable)
 Mati of Manush (Earth and Human)

References

1953 births
Living people
People from Dhaka
Bangladeshi photographers